Kristina Panayotova (born 27 August 1975) is a Bulgarian gymnast. She competed in six events at the 1992 Summer Olympics.

References

1975 births
Living people
Bulgarian female artistic gymnasts
Olympic gymnasts of Bulgaria
Gymnasts at the 1992 Summer Olympics
Gymnasts from Sofia